Süleyman Özdamar (born 25 February 1993) is a Turkish footballer who plays for Bodrumspor. He made his Süper Lig debut on 17 May 2013.

International career
Özdamar represented Turkey at the 2009 FIFA U-17 World Cup.

References

External links
 
 
 
 
 
 
 

1993 births
People from Konak
Footballers from İzmir
Living people
Turkish footballers
Turkey youth international footballers
Association football defenders
Altay S.K. footballers
Gaziantepspor footballers
Bozüyükspor footballers
Gölcükspor footballers
Bayrampaşaspor footballers
Giresunspor footballers
Aydınspor footballers
Turgutluspor footballers
Süper Lig players
TFF First League players
TFF Second League players
TFF Third League players